The Federal Bureau for Maritime Casualty Investigation (BSU) is the German agency for investigating maritime accidents and incidents. It is subordinate to the Federal Ministry of Transport, Building and Urban Development. Its head office is in the Federal Maritime and Hydrographic Agency of Germany (BSH) facility in St. Pauli, Hamburg-Mitte, Hamburg.

The office also investigates marine environmental-related incidents, such as incidents of oceanic pollution or incidents which cause a risk of pollution.

See also

 German Federal Bureau of Aircraft Accident Investigation
 Bureau d'Enquêtes sur les Événements de Mer
 Marine Accident Investigation Branch
 National Transportation Safety Board

References

External links
 Federal Bureau for Maritime Casualty Investigation
 Federal Bureau for Maritime Casualty Investigation 

German federal agencies
Organisations based in Hamburg

Maritime safety organizations